The Sun Bowl is an outdoor football stadium in the southwestern United States, on the campus of the University of Texas at El Paso. It is home to the UTEP Miners of Conference USA, and the late December college football bowl game, the Sun Bowl. The stadium opened in 1963 and has a nominal seating capacity of 51,500, although UTEP currently lists the capacity as 46,670.

History
The stadium, named for the game it hosts, was opened  in 1963 with a Texas Western win over North Texas State on September 21. The opening play was a 54-yard touchdown run by Larry Durham of the Miners.

The land on which the stadium sits was originally donated by the university to El Paso County, who built the stadium for the school and the Sun Bowl game. Both had previously used Kidd Field, the current track and field venue, which seats 15,000. The city had realized that the game could not expand its audience or the list of teams that it could invite without a bigger stadium, so the Sun Bowl was built in a natural bowl adjacent to the west. It originally sat 30,000, with only the sideline grandstands.

Renovations
The current press box was added in 1969, and the stadium reached the capacity of 52,000 in 1982 with the addition of the north end zone stands and the expansion of the east stands. (The south end zone is still vacant, with the ground of the bowl covered with the school's logos.)

The school retook control of the land and stadium in 2001, when hundreds of seats were removed as part of a re–configuration of the seating bowl to accommodate soccer, which lowered capacity to its current figure of 51,500.

The school's Athletics Director, Jim Senter, announced on April 13, 2018 plans to renovate the Sun Bowl stadium. The $15 million project would include luxury boxes installed in a new press facility, renovation of the concourses and premium seating added on the west side of the stadium. The renovations are projected to be completed in a 16-month timespan.

Notable events

Postseason college football

Sun Bowl

The college football bowl game began in January 1936 and moved to the new stadium in December 1963. All games have been played in El Paso.

All-star game
On February 2, 2007, the stadium hosted the inaugural Texas vs. The Nation all-star college football game; the Nation defeated Texas

Other events
On February 17, 2016, the stadium hosted festivities and a simulcast of the Mass held by Pope Francis during the pontiff's visit to Ciudad Juárez, Mexico, several miles away across the Rio Grande.

Other tenants
For a short time before moving to Dudley Field, the El Paso Patriots soccer team in the Premier Development League (now known as USL League Two) made its home at the Sun Bowl. The Patriots played their final seasons at Patriot Stadium.

Photos

See also
 List of NCAA Division I FBS football stadiums

References

External links

 UTEP Athletics – Sun Bowl

1963 establishments in Texas
American football venues in Texas
NCAA bowl game venues
Soccer venues in Texas
Sports venues completed in 1963
Sports venues in El Paso, Texas
Sun Bowl
UTEP Miners football venues